Andreas Güntner (born 21 July 1988) is a  German footballer who plays as a defender.

Career
He made his professional debut for Regensburg on 26 July 2008 in a 3. Liga match against Carl Zeiss Jena.

References

External links
 
 

1988 births
Living people
German footballers
SSV Jahn Regensburg players
3. Liga players
Association football defenders
SSV Jahn Regensburg II players
Berliner FC Dynamo players
Regionalliga players